Millerella is an extinct genus of fusulinid belonging to the family Eostaffellidae. Fossils of the genus have been found in Carboniferous beds in North America and central Asia.

References 

Paleozoic life
Fusulinida